Verkhnyaya Tura is a town under the administrative jurisdiction of the Town of Kushva in Sverdlovsk Oblast, Russia, located in the upper streams of the Tura River (Ob's basin),  north of Yekaterinburg. Population:

History
It was founded in 1737; town status was granted to it in 1941.

Administrative and municipal status
Within the framework of the administrative divisions, it is, together with twelve rural localities, subordinated to the Town of Kushva—an administrative unit with the status equal to that of the districts. As a municipal division, the town of Verkhnyaya Tura is incorporated as Verkhnyaya Tura Urban Okrug. The town of Kushva and twelve rural localities are incorporated separately as Kushvinsky Urban Okrug.

References

Notes

Sources

Cities and towns in Sverdlovsk Oblast
Verkhotursky Uyezd